Gazojak (also Gazochak) is a city in Darganata District, Lebap Province, Turkmenistan. It is a border crossing to Uzbekistan, across from the Pitnyak rail customs point and the Druzhba motor road customs point on the Uzbek side.

Etymology
The local economy revolves around the natural gas industry — hence, the name gaz ojak, meaning "gas furnace", a form of which, Gazachak or Gaz-Achak, it received in 1967. Prior, the settlement was called Jürränyň oýy, "Jürrä's Thought", Jürrä being a masculine name.

Transport 
There was a domestic airport but it shut down in 2004.

References

Populated places along the Silk Road
Populated places in Lebap Region